In Irish mythology, Cana Cludhmor was the mythical inventor of the harp, and often referenced as an Irish goddess of music, inspiration and dreams. After having an argument with her husband, Machuel, she left to take a midnight stroll to clear her head. She heard beautiful music on the wind and was soon lulled into a deep sleep there on the beach. When she woke up the next morning, Cana Cludhmor realised the wind had created the music by blowing through partially rotted sinew still attached to a whale skeleton. She designed the harp based on this.

Her name was misprinted as Canola in some references.

References

Characters in Irish mythology
Women in mythology